Beatriz Linhares da Silva (born 4 February 2003) is a Brazilian rhythmic gymnast. She represented Brazil at the 2020 Summer Olympics in the group all-around.

Career 
Linhares grew up training in ballet, but she switched to rhythmic gymnastics when she was nine years old. In 2017, she moved away from her family to Aracaju so she could train with the Brazilian group.

Linhares represented Brazil at the 2019 Pan American Games, and the Brazilian group won the bronze medal in the group all-around behind Mexico and the United States. They also won the bronze medal in the 5 balls event final. Then in the 3 hoops + 4 clubs, they won the gold medal.

Linhares competed at the 2021 Pan American Championships in Rio de Janeiro. The group won the gold medal in the group all-around and secured the continental quota place for the 2020 Olympic Games. The group additionally won the gold medals in both the 5 balls and the 3 hoops + 4 clubs event finals.

She was selected to compete for Brazil at the 2020 Summer Olympics in the group all-around alongside Maria Eduarda Arakaki, Déborah Medrado, Nicole Pírcio, and Geovanna Santos. They finished twelfth in the qualification round for the group all-around.

References

External links
 

2003 births
21st-century Brazilian women
Brazilian rhythmic gymnasts
Competitors at the 2019 Pan American Games
Competitors at the 2022 South American Games
Gymnasts at the 2019 Pan American Games
Gymnasts at the 2020 Summer Olympics
Living people
Medalists at the 2019 Pan American Games
Olympic gymnasts of Brazil
Pan American Games bronze medalists for Brazil
Pan American Games gold medalists for Brazil
Pan American Games medalists in gymnastics
South American Games gold medalists for Brazil
South American Games medalists in gymnastics
Sportspeople from Florianópolis